Lisa Mantchev is an American author of fantasy novels and short stories. She is best known for her Théâtre Illuminata series, a trilogy of young adult fantasy novels.

Her book Eyes Like Stars, the first in the Théâtre Illuminata series, was nominated for the 2009 Andre Norton Award for Young Adult Science Fiction and Fantasy. It was also nominated for the 2010 Mythopoeic Award for Children’s Literature. NPR selected the third book in the series, So Silver Bright, as one of 2011’s Top 5 YA Novels.

Her short fiction has appeared in Clarkesworld Magazine, Weird Tales, Strange Horizons, and Faerie Magazine.

Her most recent book, the children's picture book Strictly No Elephants, was published in October 2015.  It was included in the CCBC Choices 2016 List and is the recipient of an NCTE 2016 Charlotte Huck Award for Outstanding Fiction for Children, Honorable Mention.

Bibliography
 Eyes Like Stars, Feiwel & Friends, 2009
 Perchance to Dream, Feiwel & Friends, 2010
 So Silver Bright, Feiwel & Friends, 2011
 Ticker, Skyscape, 2014
 Lost Angeles (co-authored with A.L. Purol), Capriquarius Press, 2015
 Loose Canon (co-authored with A.L. Purol), Capriquarius Press, 2015
 Sugar Skulls (co-authored with Glenn Dallas), Skyscape, 2015
 Strictly No Elephants, Simon & Schuster/Paula Wiseman Books, 2015
 Sister Day, Simon & Schuster/Paula Wiseman Books, 2017
 Someday, Narwhal, Simon & Schuster/Paula Wiseman Books, 2017
 Jinx and the Doom Fight Crime, Simon & Schuster/Paula Wiseman Books, 2018
 Remarkables, Simon & Schuster/Paula Wiseman Books, 2019
 Perfectly Perfect Wish, Simon & Schuster/Paula Wiseman Books, 2020

References

External links
 
 Goodreads Profile

Year of birth missing (living people)
Living people
21st-century American novelists
American fantasy writers
American women short story writers
American women novelists
Women science fiction and fantasy writers
21st-century American women writers
21st-century American short story writers